Alfa Romeo 140A is an Italian bus model produced by Alfa Romeo from 1950 to 1958.
The bus was produced for Azienda Trasporti Milanesi (ATM) in Milan, Italy.

Bodies
The bus used bodies from SIAI-Marchetti from 1950 to 1951 (19 units), Macchi-Baratelli from 1952 to 1953 (30 units) and Macchi and Caproni from 1952 to 1958 (78 units).

Technical characteristics
The bus was made in two sizes, 12 or 22 meters long and had 3 or 5 axles.

The single version had 32 seats and the articulated version 46. The larger configuration can transport 150 people.

Transport
 Azienda Tranvie ed Autobus del Comune di Roma (ATAC), Rome
 ATM, Milan

See also
 List of buses

140A
Buses articles needing expert attention